Jadeite is one of the constituent minerals of the gemstone known as jade.

Jadeite may also refer to:
 Jadeite (character), a character in Sailor Moon media
 Jadeite (kitchenware), a jade-green coloured opaque milk glass used for kitchenware in the mid-20th century

See also
 Jadite, a type of translucent green glassware or vaseline glass ware